The Greer County Courthouse, on Courthouse Sq. in Mangum, Oklahoma, is a courthouse which was built in 1906.  It was listed on the National Register of Historic Places in 1985.

It is a three-story red brick building with granite and limestone trim.  It was built with an "elaborate copper-covered dome centered on the top, but.it was removed in the 1940s because the weight of the dome caused structural damage to the building."

References

Courthouses in Oklahoma
National Register of Historic Places in Greer County, Oklahoma
Government buildings completed in 1906
1906 establishments in Oklahoma Territory